Fatema Najib (born 11 May 1959) is a Bangladeshi justice of the High Court Division.

Early life 
Najib was born on 11 May 1959. She has a law degree from the University of Dhaka.

Career 
Najib started her career in Judicial Service as Munsif on 12 November 1984. 

In September 2019, Najib was appointed a District and Sessions Judge. Najib was promoted as an additional judge of the High Court Division on 31 May 2018.

References 

Living people
1959 births
University of Dhaka alumni
Bangladeshi women judges